Shah Wali Taranasaz, 1927 - 2007, was a “much admired” singer, songwriter and composer from Badakhshan, Afghanistan.

Life

Taranasaz sang more than 300 songs in Persian. He composed traditional and popular songs and some that were critical of the Taliban.

After fleeing Afghanistan, Taranasaz moved to New York City, and later to Fremont, where he could be closer to the Afghan music scene. 

He died in 2007 and was survived by a wife and two children.

Discography

References

20th-century Afghan male singers
Afghan composers
Pashtun people
Pashto-language singers
Afghan expatriate musicians in Pakistan
2007 deaths
1952 births